North Carolina's 30th Senate district is one of 50 districts in the North Carolina Senate. It has been represented by Republican Steve Jarvis since 2023.

Geography
Since 2023, the district has included all of Davidson and Davie counties. The district overlaps with the 77th, 80th, and 81st state house districts.

District officeholders

Election results

2022

2020

2018

2016

2014

2012

2010

2008

2006

2004

2002

2000

Notes

References

North Carolina Senate districts
Davidson County, North Carolina
Davie County, North Carolina